The Los Angeles Film Critics Association Award for Best Film is an award given annually by the Los Angeles Film Critics Association.

Winners

1970s

1980s

1990s

2000s

2010s

2020s

Notes
 ± Academy Award for Best Picture winner
 ≈ Academy Award for Best Picture nominee
 ≠ Oscar winner/nominee for categories other than Best Picture

References

F
Awards for best film